William (Thomas) Irvine (c. 1260–1333) (also known as William de Irwin/Irwyn or Alexander I) was a Scots soldier born in Dumfriesshire in Scotland. His father was William de Irvine of Wodehouse, Laird of Bonshaw Castle.

Armour bearer
William was the armour bearer and aide to Robert the Bruce. The Irvines had been close allies of the Bruce during his wars with England. During one such time the Bruce made flight with a few aides, riding hard and exhaustingly. At one point they had to rest and the Bruce took sleep under a holly tree while William Irvine kept guard. From this story grows the Irvines of Drum Castle's coat of arms with the holly. At the Battle of Bannockburn (where the Scots won) in June 1314 William fought alongside the Bruce.

Recognition

For his services to the Bruce, William Irvine was granted land north of Aberdeen in 1323. He was given  of John Comyn land, which included the Royal Forest of Oaks and Drum Castle, thus William became the first Laird of Drum. The Irvines would retain the land for over 650 years until it was handed over to the National Trust for Scotland.

William was Keeper of the Rolls for Scotland from 1328 to 1331. He last appears in the record in a charter of King David II of Scotland of 1332 granting him the lands of Whiterigg and Redmyres.

Family
William Irvine would marry (before 1317) a granddaughter of the Bruce, Marotte Bernard the daughter of Robert Douglas, Earl of Buchan. Marotte died in 1335. They had at least one child William (Thomas) Irvine, 2nd Laird of Drum. The Christian name of the next 12 earls of Drum was Alexander.

References

Scottish soldiers
1298 births
14th-century deaths
Scottish people of the Wars of Scottish Independence